The Haifa Wadis Trail,  (Shvil Vadiot Haifa) is a hiking path that extends the Israel National Trail into Haifa. This trail that was formed and maintained by Yarok Balev NGO forms a complete hiking circuit of approximately  through the wadis of Mount Carmel.

The trail is partially marked, and it takes an average of 3 days to hike it as a whole.  It has been opened to the public since April 2014, and was officially launched in March 2015 after actually marking it.

The trail passes along cultural and historical landmarks and through national parks around Haifa. It passes near the Bahá'í Gardens, Mahmood Mosque in Kababir, Elijah's Cave, Carmelites ruins, Technion and numerous other sites.

See also
Tourism in Israel
Geography of Israel
List of long-distance footpaths
Wildlife in Israel

References

External links
 The trail in Google Maps

Geography of Israel
Tourism in Israel
Hiking trails in Israel